ID2020 is a nongovernmental organization (501(c)(3)) which advocates for digital ID for the billion undocumented people worldwide and under-served groups like refugees. Clive Smith succeeded founder Dakota Gruener as executive director in 2022. The NGO was relatively unknown before being publicized because of misinformation related to the COVID-19 pandemic by conspiracy theorists.

History
In May 2016, at the United Nations Headquarters in New York, the inaugural ID2020 summit brought together over 400 people to discuss how to provide digital identity to all, a defined Sustainable Development Goal including to 1.5 billion people living without any form of recognized identification. Experts in blockchain and other cryptographic technology joined with representatives of technical standards bodies to identify how technology and other private sector expertise could achieve the goal.

The 2018 summit was held in September 2018, and focused on defining what constitutes a "good" digital ID. Sponsors for the event included the United Nations Office of Information Communications Technology (OICT), United Nations Refugee Agency, International Telecommunication Union and the Consulate General of Denmark in New York.

In 2019, ID2020 started a new digital identity program in collaboration with the government of Bangladesh and Global Alliance for Vaccines and Immunization.

Mission
ID2020 is a public-private consortium in service of the United Nations 2030 Sustainable Development Goal of providing legal identity for all people, including the world's most vulnerable populations.

ID2020 has published a ten-point mission statement, which includes: "We believe that individuals must have control over their own digital identities, including how personal data is collected, used, and shared."

Participants
Organizations currently or formerly participating in the ID2020 initiative include:

COVID-19 conspiracy theory
Conspiracy theorists falsely alleged that ID2020 and Bill Gates made plans for mandatory COVID-19 vaccination and the implantation of microchips into patients' bodies. As a result of these conspiracy theories, the staff at ID2020 received death threats.

References

External links 
 
 World Health Organization: Coronavirus disease (COVID-19) advice for the public: Myth busters
 Coronavirus at Politifact

Non-profit organizations based in New York City
Responses to the COVID-19 pandemic
Conspiracy theories
Conspiracy theories in the United States
Fake news
Medical-related conspiracy theories
Misinformation
Pseudohistory
Pseudoscience
Disinformation operations
2016 establishments in the United States